The  is a Japanese suspension bridge, part of the 59 kilometer Nishiseto Expressway linking the islands of Honshu and Shikoku.

References

External links
 The bridge's page at the Honshu-Shikoku Bridge Expressway Company
 

Suspension bridges in Japan
Bridges completed in 1983
Buildings and structures in Hiroshima Prefecture
Roads in Hiroshima Prefecture